Nicotine is a naturally produced alkaloid in the nightshade family of plants (most predominantly in tobacco and Duboisia hopwoodii) and is widely used recreationally as a stimulant and anxiolytic. As a pharmaceutical drug, it is used for smoking cessation to relieve withdrawal symptoms. Nicotine acts as a receptor agonist at most nicotinic acetylcholine receptors (nAChRs), except at two nicotinic receptor subunits (nAChRα9 and nAChRα10) where it acts as a receptor antagonist.

Nicotine constitutes approximately 0.6–3.0% of the dry weight of tobacco. Nicotine is also present at ppb-concentrations in edible plants in the family Solanaceae, including potatoes, tomatoes, and eggplants, though sources disagree on whether this has any biological significance to human consumers. It functions as an antiherbivore toxin; consequently, nicotine was widely used as an insecticide in the past, and neonicotinoids (structurally similar to nicotine), such as imidacloprid, are some of the most effective and widely used insecticides.

Nicotine is highly addictive. Slow-release forms (gums and patches, when used correctly) are less addictive and aid in quitting. Animal research suggests that monoamine oxidase inhibitors present in tobacco smoke may enhance nicotine's addictive properties. An average cigarette yields about 2 mg of absorbed nicotine. 
The estimated lower dose limit for fatal outcomes is 500–1,000 mg of ingested nicotine for an adult (6.5–13 mg/kg). Nicotine addiction involves drug-reinforced behavior, compulsive use, and relapse following abstinence. Nicotine dependence involves tolerance, sensitization, physical dependence, psychological dependence, and can cause distress. Nicotine withdrawal symptoms include depressed mood, stress, anxiety, irritability, difficulty concentrating, and sleep disturbances. Mild nicotine withdrawal symptoms are measurable in unrestricted smokers, who experience normal moods only as their blood nicotine levels peak, with each cigarette. On quitting, withdrawal symptoms worsen sharply, then gradually improve to a normal state.

Nicotine use as a tool for quitting smoking has a good safety history. Animal studies suggest that nicotine may adversely affect cognitive development in adolescence, but the relevance of these findings to human brain development is disputed. At low amounts, it has a mild analgesic effect. According to the International Agency for Research on Cancer, "nicotine is not generally considered to be a carcinogen."
The Surgeon General of the United States indicates that evidence is inadequate to infer the presence or absence of a causal relationship between exposure to nicotine and risk for cancer. Nicotine has been shown to produce birth defects in humans and is considered a teratogen. The median lethal dose of nicotine in humans is unknown. High doses are known to cause nicotine poisoning, organ failure, and death through paralysis of respiratory muscles, though serious or fatal overdoses are rare.

Uses

Medical

The primary therapeutic use of nicotine is treating nicotine dependence to eliminate smoking and the damage it does to health. Controlled levels of nicotine are given to patients through gums, dermal patches, lozenges, inhalers, or nasal sprays to wean them off their dependence.

Combining nicotine patch use with a faster acting nicotine replacement, like gum or spray, improves the odds of treatment success. 4 mg versus 2 mg nicotine gum also increase the chances of success.

Nicotine is being researched in clinical trials for possible benefit in treating Parkinson's disease, dementia, ADHD, depression and sarcoma.

In contrast to recreational nicotine products, which have been designed to maximize the likelihood of addiction, nicotine replacement products (NRTs) are designed to minimize addictiveness. The more quickly a dose of nicotine is delivered and absorbed, the higher the addiction risk.

Pesticide
Nicotine has been used as an insecticide since at least the 1690s, in the form of tobacco extracts (although other components of tobacco also seem to have pesticide effects). Nicotine pesticides have not been commercially available in the US since 2014, and homemade pesticides are banned on organic crops and not recommended for small gardeners. Nicotine pesticides have been banned in the EU since 2009. Foods are imported from countries in which nicotine pesticides are allowed, such as China, but foods may not exceed maximum nicotine levels. Neonicotinoids, which are derived from and structurally similar to nicotine, are widely used as agricultural and veterinary pesticides as of 2016.

In nicotine-producing plants, nicotine functions as an antiherbivory chemical; consequently, nicotine has been widely used as an insecticide, and neonicotinoids, such as imidacloprid, are widely used.

Performance
Nicotine-containing products are sometimes used for the performance-enhancing effects of nicotine on cognition. A 2010 meta-analysis of 41 double-blind, placebo-controlled studies concluded that nicotine or smoking had significant positive effects on aspects of fine motor abilities, alerting and orienting attention, and episodic and working memory. A 2015 review noted that stimulation of the α4β2 nicotinic receptor is responsible for certain improvements in attentional performance; among the nicotinic receptor subtypes, nicotine has the highest binding affinity at the α4β2 receptor (ki=1 ), which is also the biological target that mediates nicotine's addictive properties. Nicotine has potential beneficial effects, but it also has paradoxical effects, which may be due to the inverted U-shape of the dose-response curve or pharmacokinetic features.

Recreational
Nicotine is used as a recreational drug. It is widely used, highly addictive and hard to discontinue. Nicotine is often used compulsively, and dependence can develop within days. Recreational drug users commonly use nicotine for its mood-altering effects. Recreational nicotine products include chewing tobacco, cigars, cigarettes, e-cigarettes, snuff, pipe tobacco, and snus.

Alcohol infused with nicotine is called nicotini.

Contraindications
Nicotine use for tobacco cessation has few contraindications.

It is not known whether nicotine replacement therapy is effective for smoking cessation in adolescents, as of 2014. It is therefore not recommended to adolescents. It is not safe to use nicotine during pregnancy or breastfeeding, although it is safer than smoking; the desirability of NRT use in pregnancy is therefore debated.

Randomized trials and observational studies of nicotine replacement therapy in cardiovascular patients show no increase in adverse cardiovascular events compared to those treated with placebo. Using nicotine products during cancer treatment is contra indicated, as nicotine promotes tumour growth, but temporary use of NRTs to quit smoking may be advised for harm reduction.

Nicotine gum is contraindicated in individuals with temporomandibular joint disease. People with chronic nasal disorders and severe reactive airway disease require additional precautions when using nicotine nasal sprays. Nicotine in any form is contraindicated in individuals with a known hypersensitivity to nicotine.

Adverse effects
Nicotine is classified as a poison. However, at doses used by consumers, it presents little if any hazard to the user. A 2018 Cochrane Collaboration review lists nine main adverse events related to nicotine replacement therapy: headache, dizziness/light-headedness, nausea/vomiting, gastro-intestinal symptoms, sleep/dream problems, non-ischemic palpitations and chest pain, skin reactions, oral/nasal reactions and hiccups. Many of these were also common in the placebo group without nicotine. Palpitations and chest pain were deemed "rare" and there was no evidence of an increased number of serious cardiac problems compared to the placebo group, even in people with established cardiac disease. The common side effects from nicotine exposure are listed in the table below. Serious adverse events due to the use of nicotine replacement therapy are extremely rare. At low amounts, it has a mild analgesic effect. At sufficiently high doses, nicotine may result in nausea, vomiting, diarrhea, salivation, bradyarrhythmia, and possibly seizures, hypoventilation, and death.

Sleep

Nicotine reduces the amount of rapid eye movement (REM) sleep, slow-wave sleep (SWS), and total sleep time in healthy nonsmokers given nicotine via a transdermal patch, and the reduction is dose-dependent. Acute nicotine intoxication has been found to significantly reduce total sleep time and increase REM latency, sleep onset latency, and non-rapid eye movement (NREM) stage 2 sleep time. Depressive non-smokers experience mood and sleep improvements under nicotine administration; however, subsequent nicotine withdrawal has a negative effect on both mood and sleep.

Cardiovascular system

A 2018 Cochrane review found that, in rare cases, nicotine replacement therapy can cause non-ischemic chest pain (i.e., chest pain that is unrelated to a heart attack) and heart palpitations, but does not increase the incidence of serious cardiac adverse events (i.e., myocardial infarction, stroke, and cardiac death) relative to controls.

A 2016 review of the cardiovascular toxicity of nicotine concluded, "Based on current knowledge, we believe that the cardiovascular risks of nicotine from e-cigarette use in people without cardiovascular disease are quite low. We have concerns that nicotine from e-cigarettes could pose some risk for users with cardiovascular disease."

Blood pressure
In the short term, nicotine causes a transient increase in blood pressure, but in the long term, epidemiological studies generally do not show increased blood pressure or hypertension among nicotine users.

Reinforcement disorders

Nicotine is highly addictive. Its addictiveness depends on how it is administered. Animal research suggests that monoamine oxidase inhibitors in tobacco smoke may enhance its addictiveness. Nicotine dependence involves aspects of both psychological dependence and physical dependence, since discontinuation of extended use has been shown to produce both affective (e.g., anxiety, irritability, craving, anhedonia) and somatic (mild motor dysfunctions such as tremor) withdrawal symptoms. Withdrawal symptoms peak in one to three days and can persist for several weeks. Some people experience symptoms for 6 months or longer.

Normal between-cigarettes discontinuation, in unrestricted smokers, causes mild but measurable nicotine withdrawal symptoms. These include mildly worse mood, stress, anxiety, cognition, and sleep, all of which briefly return to normal with the next cigarette. Smokers have worse mood than they would have if they were not nicotine-dependent; they experience normal moods only immediately after smoking. Nicotine dependence is associated with poor sleep quality and shorter sleep duration among smokers.

In dependent smokers, withdrawal causes impairments in memory and attention, and smoking during withdrawal returns these cognitive abilities to pre-withdrawal levels. The temporarily increased cognitive levels of smokers after inhaling smoke are offset by periods of cognitive decline during nicotine withdrawal. Therefore, the overall daily cognitive levels of smokers and non-smokers are roughly similar.

Nicotine activates the mesolimbic pathway and induces long-term ΔFosB expression (i.e., produces phosphorylated ΔFosB isoforms) in the nucleus accumbens when inhaled or injected frequently or at high doses, but not necessarily when ingested. Consequently, high daily exposure (possibly excluding oral route) to nicotine can cause ΔFosB overexpression in the nucleus accumbens, resulting in nicotine addiction.

Cancer

Although nicotine itself does not cause cancer in humans, it is unclear whether it functions as a tumor promoter . A 2018 report by the US National Academies of Sciences, Engineering, and Medicine concludes, "[w]hile it is biologically plausible that nicotine can act as a tumor promoter, the existing body of evidence indicates this is unlikely to translate into increased risk of human cancer."

Low levels of nicotine stimulate cell proliferation, while high levels are cytotoxic. Nicotine increases cholinergic signaling and adrenergic signaling in colon cancer cells, thereby impeding apoptosis (programmed cell death), promoting tumor growth, and activating growth factors and cellular mitogenic factors such as 5-lipoxygenase (5-LOX), and epidermal growth factor (EGF). Nicotine also promotes cancer growth by stimulating angiogenesis and neovascularization. Nicotine promotes lung cancer development and accelerates its proliferation, angiogenesis, migration, invasion and epithelial–mesenchymal transition (EMT), via its influence on nAChRs receptors, whose presence has been confirmed in lung cancer cells. In cancer cells, nicotine promotes the epithelial–mesenchymal transition which makes the cancer cells more resistant to drugs that treat cancer.

Nicotine in tobacco can form carcinogenic tobacco-specific nitrosamines through a nitrosation reaction. This occurs mostly in the curing and processing of tobacco. However, nicotine in the mouth and stomach can react to form N-Nitrosonornicotine, a known type 1 carcinogen, suggesting that consumption of non-tobacco forms of nicotine may still play a role in carcinogenesis.

Genotoxicity

Nicotine causes DNA damage in several types of human cells as judged by assays for genotoxicity such as the comet assay, cytokinesis-block micronucleus test and chromosome aberrations test. In humans, this damage can happen in primary parotid gland cells, lymphocytes, respiratory tract cells.

Pregnancy and breastfeeding
Nicotine has been shown to produce birth defects in some animal species, but not others; consequently, it is considered to be a possible teratogen in humans. In animal studies that resulted in birth defects, researchers found that nicotine negatively affects fetal brain development and pregnancy outcomes; the negative effects on early brain development are associated with abnormalities in brain metabolism and neurotransmitter system function. Nicotine crosses the placenta and is found in the breast milk of mothers who smoke as well as mothers who inhale passive smoke.

Nicotine exposure in utero is responsible for several complications of pregnancy and birth: pregnant women who smoke are at greater risk for both miscarriage and stillbirth and infants exposed to nicotine in utero tend to have lower birth weights. A McMaster University research group observed in 2010 that rats exposed to nicotine in the womb (via parenteral infusion) later in life had conditions including type 2 diabetes, obesity, hypertension, neurobehavioral defects, respiratory dysfunction, and infertility.

Overdose

It is unlikely that a person would overdose on nicotine through smoking alone. The US Food and Drug Administration (FDA) stated in 2013 that there are no significant safety concerns associated with the use of more than one form of over-the-counter (OTC) nicotine replacement therapy at the same time, or using OTC NRT at the same time as another nicotine-containing product, like cigarettes. The median lethal dose of nicotine in humans is unknown. Nevertheless, nicotine has a relatively high toxicity in comparison to many other alkaloids such as caffeine, which has an LD50 of 127 mg/kg when administered to mice. At sufficiently high doses, it is associated with nicotine poisoning, which, while common in children (in whom poisonous and lethal levels occur at lower doses per kilogram of body weight) rarely results in significant morbidity or death. The estimated lower dose limit for fatal outcomes is 500–1,000 mg of ingested nicotine for an adult (6.5–13 mg/kg).

The initial symptoms of a nicotine overdose typically include nausea, vomiting, diarrhea, hypersalivation, abdominal pain, tachycardia (rapid heart rate), hypertension (high blood pressure), tachypnea (rapid breathing), headache, dizziness, pallor (pale skin), auditory or visual disturbances, and perspiration, followed shortly after by marked bradycardia (slow heart rate), bradypnea (slow breathing), and hypotension (low blood pressure). An increased respiratory rate (i.e., tachypnea) is one of the primary signs of nicotine poisoning. At sufficiently high doses, somnolence (sleepiness or drowsiness), confusion, syncope (loss of consciousness from fainting), shortness of breath, marked weakness, seizures, and coma may occur. Lethal nicotine poisoning rapidly produces seizures, and death – which may occur within minutes – is believed to be due to respiratory paralysis.

Toxicity

Today nicotine is less commonly used in agricultural insecticides, which was a main source of poisoning. More recent cases of poisoning typically appear to be in the form of Green Tobacco Sickness, accidental ingestion of tobacco or tobacco products, or ingestion of nicotine-containing plants. People who harvest or cultivate tobacco may experience Green Tobacco Sickness (GTS), a type of nicotine poisoning caused by dermal exposure to wet tobacco leaves. This occurs most commonly in young, inexperienced tobacco harvesters who do not consume tobacco. People can be exposed to nicotine in the workplace by breathing it in, skin absorption, swallowing it, or eye contact. The Occupational Safety and Health Administration (OSHA) has set the legal limit (permissible exposure limit) for nicotine exposure in the workplace as 0.5 mg/m3 skin exposure over an 8-hour workday. The US National Institute for Occupational Safety and Health (NIOSH) has set a recommended exposure limit (REL) of 0.5 mg/m3 skin exposure over an 8-hour workday. At environmental levels of 5 mg/m3, nicotine is immediately dangerous to life and health.

Drug interactions

Pharmacodynamic
 Potential interaction with sympathomimetic drugs (adrenergic agonists) and sympatholytic drugs (alpha-blockers and beta-blockers).

Pharmacokinetic
Nicotine and cigarette smoke both induce the expression of liver enzymes (e.g., certain cytochrome P450 proteins) which metabolize drugs, leading to the potential for alterations in drug metabolism.
 Smoking cessation may decrease the metabolism of acetaminophen, beta-blockers, caffeine, oxazepam, pentazocine, propoxyphene, theophylline, and tricyclic antidepressants, leading to higher plasma concentrations of these drugs.
 Possible alteration of nicotine absorption through the skin from the transdermal nicotine patch by drugs that cause vasodilation or vasoconstriction.
 Possible alteration of nicotine absorption through the nasal cavity from the nicotine nasal spray by nasal vasoconstrictors (e.g., xylometazoline).
 Possible alteration of nicotine absorption through oral mucosa from nicotine gum and lozenges by food and drink that modify salivary pH.

Pharmacology

Pharmacodynamics
Nicotine acts as a receptor agonist at most nicotinic acetylcholine receptors (nAChRs), except at two nicotinic receptor subunits (nAChRα9 and nAChRα10) where it acts as a receptor antagonist. Such antagonism results in mild analgesia.

Central nervous system

By binding to nicotinic acetylcholine receptors in the brain, nicotine elicits its psychoactive effects and increases the levels of several neurotransmitters in various brain structures – acting as a sort of "volume control".  Nicotine has a higher affinity for nicotinic receptors in the brain than those in skeletal muscle, though at toxic doses it can induce contractions and respiratory paralysis. Nicotine's selectivity is thought to be due to a particular amino acid difference on these receptor subtypes. Nicotine is unusual in comparison to most drugs, as its profile changes from stimulant to sedative with increasing dosages, a phenomenon known as "Nesbitt's paradox" after the doctor who first described it in 1969. At very high doses it dampens neuronal activity. Nicotine induces both behavioral stimulation and anxiety in animals. Research into nicotine's most predominant metabolite, cotinine, suggests that some of nicotine's psychoactive effects are mediated by cotinine.

Nicotine activates nicotinic receptors (particularly α4β2 nicotinic receptors, but also α5 nAChRs) on neurons that innervate the ventral tegmental area and within the mesolimbic pathway where it appears to cause the release of dopamine. This nicotine-induced dopamine release occurs at least partially through activation of the cholinergic–dopaminergic reward link in the ventral tegmental area. Nicotine can modulate the firing rate of the ventral tegmental area neurons. Nicotine also appears to induce the release of endogenous opioids that activate opioid pathways in the reward system, since naltrexone – an opioid receptor antagonist – blocks nicotine self-administration. These actions are largely responsible for the strongly reinforcing effects of nicotine, which often occur in the absence of euphoria; however, mild euphoria from nicotine use can occur in some individuals. Chronic nicotine use inhibits class I and II histone deacetylases in the striatum, where this effect plays a role in nicotine addiction.

Sympathetic nervous system

Nicotine also activates the sympathetic nervous system, acting via splanchnic nerves to the adrenal medulla, stimulating the release of epinephrine. Acetylcholine released by preganglionic sympathetic fibers of these nerves acts on nicotinic acetylcholine receptors, causing the release of epinephrine (and norepinephrine) into the bloodstream.

Adrenal medulla
By binding to ganglion type nicotinic receptors in the adrenal medulla, nicotine increases flow of adrenaline (epinephrine), a stimulating hormone and neurotransmitter. By binding to the receptors, it causes cell depolarization and an influx of calcium through voltage-gated calcium channels. Calcium triggers the exocytosis of chromaffin granules and thus the release of epinephrine (and norepinephrine) into the bloodstream. The release of epinephrine (adrenaline) causes an increase in heart rate, blood pressure and respiration, as well as higher blood glucose levels.

Pharmacokinetics

As nicotine enters the body, it is distributed quickly through the bloodstream and crosses the blood–brain barrier reaching the brain within 10–20 seconds after inhalation. The elimination half-life of nicotine in the body is around two hours. Nicotine is primarily excreted in urine and urinary concentrations vary depending upon urine flow rate and urine pH.

The amount of nicotine absorbed by the body from smoking can depend on many factors, including the types of tobacco, whether the smoke is inhaled, and whether a filter is used. However, it has been found that the nicotine yield of individual products has only a small effect (4.4%) on the blood concentration of nicotine, suggesting "the assumed health advantage of switching to lower-tar and lower-nicotine cigarettes may be largely offset by the tendency of smokers to compensate by increasing inhalation".

Nicotine has a half-life of 1–2 hours. Cotinine is an active metabolite of nicotine that remains in the blood with a half-life of 18–20 hours, making it easier to analyze.

Nicotine is metabolized in the liver by cytochrome P450 enzymes (mostly CYP2A6, and also by CYP2B6) and FMO3, which selectively metabolizes (S)-nicotine. A major metabolite is cotinine. Other primary metabolites include nicotine N'''-oxide, nornicotine, nicotine isomethonium ion, 2-hydroxynicotine and nicotine glucuronide. Under some conditions, other substances may be formed such as myosmine.

Glucuronidation and oxidative metabolism of nicotine to cotinine are both inhibited by menthol, an additive to mentholated cigarettes, thus increasing the half-life of nicotine in vivo.

 Metabolism 

Nicotine decreases hunger and food consumption. The majority of research shows that nicotine reduces body weight, but some researchers have found that nicotine may result in weight gain under specific types of eating habits in animal models. Nicotine effect on weight appears to result from nicotine's stimulation of α3β4 nAChR receptors located in the POMC neurons in the arcuate nucleus and subsequently the melanocortin system, especially the melanocortin-4 receptors on second-order neurons in the paraventricular nucleus of the hypothalamus, thus modulating feeding inhibition. POMC neurons are a precursor of the melanocortin system, a critical regulator of body weight and peripheral tissue such as skin and hair.

Chemistry

Nicotine is a hygroscopic, colorless to yellow-brown, oily liquid, that is readily soluble in alcohol, ether or light petroleum. It is miscible with water in its neutral amine base form between 60 °C and 210 °C. It is a dibasic nitrogenous base, having Kb1=1×10−6, Kb2=1×10−11. It readily forms ammonium salts with acids that are usually solid and water-soluble. Its flash point is 95 °C and its auto-ignition temperature is 244 °C. Nicotine is readily volatile (vapor pressure 5.5 Pa at 25 °C) On exposure to ultraviolet light or various oxidizing agents, nicotine is converted to nicotine oxide, nicotinic acid (niacin, vitamin B3), and methylamine.

Nicotine is chiral and hence optically active, having two enantiomeric forms. The naturally occurring form of nicotine is levorotatory with a specific rotation of [α]D=–166.4° ((−)-nicotine). The dextrorotatory form, (+)-nicotine is physiologically less active than (−)-nicotine. (−)-nicotine is more toxic than (+)-nicotine. The salts of (−)-nicotine are usually dextrorotatory; this conversion between levorotatory and dextrorotatory upon protonation is common among alkaloids. The hydrochloride and sulfate salts become optically inactive if heated in a closed vessel above 180 °C. Anabasine is a structural isomer of nicotine, as both compounds have the molecular formula .

Nicotine that is found in natural tobacco is primarily (99%) the S-enantiomer.  Conversely, the most common chemistry synthetic methods for generating nicotine yields a product that is approximately equal proportions of the S- and R-enantiomers. This suggests that tobacco-derived and synthetic nicotine can be determined by measuring the ratio of the two different enantiomers, although means exist for adjusting the relative levels of the enantiomers or performing a synthesis that only leads to the S-enantiomer. There is limited data on the relative physiological effects of these two enantiomers, especially in people. However, the studies to date indicate that (S)-nicotine is more potent than (R)-nicotine and (S)-nicotine causes stronger sensations or irritation than (R)-nicotine. To date, studies are not adequate to determine the relative addictiveness of the two enantiomers in people. 
Pod mod electronic cigarettes use nicotine in the form of a protonated nicotine, rather than free-base nicotine found in earlier generations.

Preparation
The first laboratory preparation of nicotine (as its racemate) was described in 1904.

The starting material was an N-substituted pyrrole derivative, which was heated to convert it by a [1,5] sigmatropic shift to the isomer with a carbon bond between the pyrrole and pyridine rings, followed by methylation and selective reduction of the pyrrole ring using tin and hydrochloric acid. Many other syntheses of nicotine, in both racemic and chiral forms have since been published.

Biosynthesis

The biosynthetic pathway of nicotine involves a coupling reaction between the two cyclic structures that comprise nicotine. Metabolic studies show that the pyridine ring of nicotine is derived from niacin (nicotinic acid) while the pyrrolidine is derived from N-methyl-Δ1-pyrrollidium cation. Biosynthesis of the two component structures proceeds via two independent syntheses, the NAD pathway for niacin and the tropane pathway for N-methyl-Δ1-pyrrollidium cation.

The NAD pathway in the genus Nicotiana begins with the oxidation of aspartic acid into α-amino succinate by aspartate oxidase (AO). This is followed by a condensation with glyceraldehyde-3-phosphate and a cyclization catalyzed by quinolinate synthase (QS) to give quinolinic acid. Quinolinic acid then reacts with phosphoribosyl pyrophosphate catalyzed by quinolinic acid phosphoribosyl transferase (QPT) to form niacin mononucleotide (NaMN). The reaction now proceeds via the NAD salvage cycle to produce niacin via the conversion of nicotinamide by the enzyme nicotinamidase.

The N-methyl-Δ1-pyrrollidium cation used in the synthesis of nicotine is an intermediate in the synthesis of tropane-derived alkaloids. Biosynthesis begins with decarboxylation of ornithine by ornithine decarboxylase (ODC) to produce putrescine. Putrescine is then converted into N-methyl putrescine via methylation by SAM catalyzed by putrescine N-methyltransferase (PMT). N-methyl putrescine then undergoes deamination into 4-methylaminobutanal by the N-methyl putrescine oxidase (MPO) enzyme, 4-methylaminobutanal then spontaneously cyclize into N-methyl-Δ1-pyrrollidium cation.

The final step in the synthesis of nicotine is the coupling between N-methyl-Δ1-pyrrollidium cation and niacin. Although studies conclude some form of coupling between the two component structures, the definite process and mechanism remains undetermined. The current agreed theory involves the conversion of niacin into 2,5-dihydropyridine through 3,6-dihydronicotinic acid. The 2,5-dihydropyridine intermediate would then react with N-methyl-Δ1-pyrrollidium cation to form enantiomerically pure (−)-nicotine.

Detection in body fluids

Nicotine can be quantified in blood, plasma, or urine to confirm a diagnosis of poisoning or to facilitate a medicolegal death investigation. Urinary or salivary cotinine concentrations are frequently measured for the purposes of pre-employment and health insurance medical screening programs. Careful interpretation of results is important, since passive exposure to cigarette smoke can result in significant accumulation of nicotine, followed by the appearance of its metabolites in various body fluids. Nicotine use is not regulated in competitive sports programs.

 Methods for analysis of enantiomers 
Methods for measuring the two enantiomers are straightforward and include normal-phase liquid chromatography, liquid chromatography with a chiral column. However, since methods can be used to alter the two enantiomers, it may not be possible to distinguish tobacco-derived from synthetic nicotine simply by measuring the levels of the two enantiomers. A new approach uses hydrogen and deuterium nuclear magnetic resonance to distinguish tobacco-derived and synthetic nicotine based on differences the substrates used in the natural synthetic pathway performed in the tobacco plant and the substrates most used in synthesis. Another approach measures the carbon-14 content which also differs between natural and laboratory-based tobacco. These methods remain to be fully evaluated and validated using a wide range of samples.

 Natural occurrence 
Nicotine is a secondary metabolite produced in a variety of plants in the family Solanaceae, most notably in tobacco Nicotiana tabacum, where it can be found at high concentrations of 0.5 to 7.5%. Nicotine is also found in the leaves of other tobacco species, such as Nicotiana rustica (in amounts of 2–14%). Nicotine production is strongly induced in response to wounding as part of a jasmonate-dependent reaction. Specialist insects on tobacco, such as the tobacco hornworm (Manduca sexta), have a number of adaptations to the detoxification and even adaptive re-purposing of nicotine. Nicotine is also found at low concentrations in the nectar of tobacco plants, where it may promote outcrossing by affecting the behavior of hummingbird pollinators.

Nicotine occurs in smaller amounts (varying from 2–7 μg/kg, or 20–70 millionths of a percent wet weight) in other Solanaceaeous plants, including some crop species such as potatoes, tomatoes, eggplant, and peppers, as well as non-crop species such as Duboisia hopwoodii. The amounts of nicotine in tomatoes lowers substantially as the fruit ripens. A 1999 report found "In some papers it is suggested that the contribution of dietary nicotine intake is significant when compared with exposure to ETS [environmental tobacco smoke] or by active smoking of small numbers of cigarettes. Others consider the dietary intake to be negligible unless inordinately large amounts of specific vegetables are consumed." The amount of nicotine eaten per day is roughly around 1.4 and 2.25 μg/day at the 95th percentile. These numbers may be low due to insufficient food intake data. The concentrations of nicotine in vegetables are difficult to measure accurately, since they are very low (parts per billion range).

History, society and culture

Nicotine was originally isolated from the tobacco plant in 1828 by chemists Wilhelm Heinrich Posselt and Karl Ludwig Reimann from Germany, who believed it was a poison. Its chemical empirical formula was described by Melsens in 1843, its structure was discovered by Adolf Pinner and Richard Wolffenstein in 1893, and it was first synthesized by Amé Pictet and A. Rotschy in 1904.

Nicotine is named after the tobacco plant Nicotiana tabacum, which in turn is named after the French ambassador in Portugal, Jean Nicot de Villemain, who sent tobacco and seeds to Paris in 1560, presented to the French King, and who promoted their medicinal use. Smoking was believed to protect against illness, particularly the plague.

Tobacco was introduced to Europe in 1559, and by the late 17th century, it was used not only for smoking but also as an insecticide. After World War II, over 2,500 tons of nicotine insecticide were used worldwide, but by the 1980s the use of nicotine insecticide had declined below 200 tons. This was due to the availability of other insecticides that are cheaper and less harmful to mammals.

The nicotine content of popular American-brand cigarettes has increased over time, and one study found that there was an average increase of 1.78% per year between the years of 1998 and 2005.

Although methods of production of synthetic nicotine have existed for decades, it was believed that the cost of making nicotine by laboratory synthesis was cost prohibitive compared to extracting nicotine from tobacco. However, recently synthetic nicotine started to be found in different brands of e-cigarettes and oral pouches and marketed as “tobacco-free.”

The US FDA is tasked with reviewing tobacco products such as e-cigarettes and determining which can be authorized for sale.  In response to the likelihood that FDA would not authorize many e-cigarettes to be marketed, e-cigarette companies began marketing products that they claimed to contain nicotine that were not made or derived from tobacco, but contained synthetic nicotine instead, and thus, would be outside FDA’s tobacco regulatory authority. Similarly, nicotine pouches that claimed to contain non-tobacco (synthetic) nicotine were also introduced. The cost of synthetic nicotine has decreased as the market for the product increased. In March 2022, the U.S. Congress passed a law (the Consolidated Appropriations Act, 2022) that expanded FDA’s tobacco regulatory authority to include tobacco products containing nicotine from any source, thereby including products made with synthetic nicotine.

 Legal status 
In the United States, nicotine products and Nicotine Replacement Therapy products like Nicotrol are only available to persons 21 and above; proof of age is required; not for sale in vending machine or from any source where proof of age cannot be verified. As of 2019, the minimum age to use tobacco in the US is 21 at the federal level.

In the European Union, the minimum age to purchase nicotine products is 18. However, there is no minimum age requirement to use tobacco or nicotine products.

 In media 

In some anti-smoking literature, the harm that tobacco smoking and nicotine addiction does is personified as Nick O'Teen, represented as a humanoid with some aspect of a cigarette or cigarette butt about him or his clothes and hat. Nick O'Teen was a villain that was created for the Health Education Council.

Nicotine was often compared to caffeine in advertisements in the 1980s by the tobacco industry, and later in the 2010s by the electronic cigarettes industry, in an effort to reduce the stigmatization and the public perception of the risks associated with nicotine use.

Research

 Central nervous system 
While acute/initial nicotine intake causes activation of neuronal nicotine receptors, chronic low doses of nicotine use leads to desensitization of those receptors (due to the development of tolerance) and results in an antidepressant effect, with early research showing low dose nicotine patches could be an effective treatment of major depressive disorder in non-smokers.

Though tobacco smoking is associated with an increased risk of Alzheimer's disease, there is evidence that nicotine itself has the potential to prevent and treat Alzheimer's disease.

Smoking is associated with a decreased risk of Parkinson's Disease; however, it is unknown whether this is due to people with healthier brain dopaminergic reward centers (the area of the brain affected by Parkinson's) being more likely to enjoy smoking and thus pick up the habit, nicotine directly acting as a neuroprotective agent, or other compounds in cigarette smoke acting as neuroprotective agents.

 Immune system 

Immune cells of both the Innate immune system and adaptive immune systems frequently express the α2, α5, α6, α7, α9, and α10 subunits of nicotinic acetylcholine receptors. Evidence suggests that nicotinic receptors which contain these subunits are involved in the regulation of immune function.

 Optopharmacology 
A photoactivatable form of nicotine, which releases nicotine when exposed to ultraviolet light with certain conditions, has been developed for studying nicotinic acetylcholine receptors in brain tissue.

 Oral health 
Several in vitro studies have investigated the potential effects of nicotine on a range of oral cells. A recent systematic review concluded that nicotine was unlikely to be cytotoxic to oral cells in vitro'' in most physiological conditions but further research is needed. Understanding the potential role of nicotine in oral health has become increasingly important given the recent introduction of novel nicotine products and their potential role in helping smokers quit.

See also 
 6-Chloronicotine
 Nicotine marketing

References

External links 

 Toxicology monograph for Nicotine from the Hazardous Substances Data Bank
 Chemical Hazards monograph for Nicotine from the National Institute for Occupational Safety and Health
 Laboratory Chemical Safety Summary for Nicotine from PubChem

Alkaloids found in Erythroxylum coca
Alkaloids found in Nicotiana
Anorectics
Pfizer brands
GSK plc brands
Anxiolytics
Euphoriants
Nicotinic agonists
Nicotinic antagonists
Plant toxin insecticides
Pregnane X receptor agonists
Pyridine alkaloids
Pyrrolidine alkaloids
Smoking
Stimulants
Teratogens
3-Pyridyl compounds